David Anthony Casinelli (May 23, 1940 – October 11, 1987), also known as "Bull" Casinelli, was an American football player.  He grew up in Follansbee, West Virginia, and played college football for the Memphis State football team from 1960 to 1963.

In 1963, Casinelli led Memphis State to an undefeated season and a #14 ranking in the final UPI Coaches Poll.  He also became the first Memphis State player to lead the NCAA in a major individual statistical category and the first Southern player to win the NCAA rushing title since John Dottley in 1949. Going into the final game of the 1963 season, he ranked third in rushing yardage but totaled 210 rushing yards in the final game to finish ahead of Jimmy Sidle and Gale Sayers.  He led the NCAA for the 1963 season in rushing yardage (1,016 yards) and rushing carries (219). He also tied with Cosmo Iacavazzi for the national scoring title with 84 points, each having scored 14 touchdowns.

During his four years at Memphis, Casinelli established school records with 2,796 total yards from scrimmage and 36 career touchdowns. In January 1964, he signed with the Edmonton Eskimos of the Canadian Football League. Casinelli died as the result of injuries sustained in an automobile accident in 1987 in Leon County, Florida.

See also
 List of NCAA major college football yearly rushing leaders
 List of NCAA major college football yearly scoring leaders

References

1940 births
1987 deaths
American football halfbacks
Memphis Tigers football players
Players of American football from West Virginia
People from Follansbee, West Virginia
Road incident deaths in Florida